Philipp Heerwagen (born 13 April 1983) is a German professional footballer who plays as a goalkeeper.

Career statistics

References

External links
  
 

1983 births
Living people
People from Kelheim
Sportspeople from Lower Bavaria
German footballers
Footballers from Bavaria
Association football goalkeepers
Germany youth international footballers
Bundesliga players
2. Bundesliga players
SpVgg Unterhaching players
VfL Bochum players
FC St. Pauli players
FC Ingolstadt 04 players
SV Sandhausen players